Ron Baxter (born June 18, 1958) is an American former basketball shooting guard who played for the University of Texas men's basketball team from 1976 to 1980, and helped lead the Longhorns to the 1978 NIT championship. Baxter graduated school with the Texas record for rebounds (916) as well as points (1.897). His son, Paul Baxter, played basketball for Sam Houston State University.

Honors
 Two-time first-team All-Southwest Conference pick (1978, 1980)
 Voted team MVP in 1977 and 1980
 Member of the 1978 NIT championship team
 Averaged double-digits in scoring in each of his four years
 Fourth in UT history in career points (1,897) and rebounds (919)
 Third in school history with 40 career double-doubles
 Inducted into the Longhorn Hall of Honor in 2001

References

External links
Statistics, thedraftreview.com; accessed June 2, 2017.

1958 births
Living people
American men's basketball players
Basketball players from Los Angeles
Los Angeles Lakers draft picks
Reno Bighorns (CBA) players
Shooting guards
Texas Longhorns men's basketball players